The list of ship launches in 1921 includes a chronological list of some ships launched in 1921.


References

Sources

1921
Ship launches